Helicopter Sea Combat Squadron Eight (HSC-8) "Eightballers" is a United States Navy helicopter squadron based at Naval Air Station North Island, San Diego, California. HSC-8 is attached to Carrier Air Wing 11 (CVW-11) and deploys aboard . HSC-8 was redesignated from HS-8 on 28 September 2007.

Mission
Helicopter Sea Combat Squadron Eight (HSC-8), "America's Premier Combat Helicopter Squadron", executes helicopter utility and light attack missions in support of Carrier Air Wing ELEVEN (CVW-11), USS Theodore Roosevelt (CVN-71) and Carrier Strike Group 9 (CSG-9) operations.

History
HSC-8 traces its lineage to the second of two squadrons which bore the designation Helicopter Antisubmarine Squadron EIGHT (HS-8). That Squadron which has become HSC-8 was established on 1 November 1969.

The first squadron designated HS-8 was established at Naval Auxiliary Air Station Ream Field, Imperial Beach, California on 1 June 1956. The first helicopters employed by the command were the HSS-1N Seabat. In September 1962 in compliance with the 1962 United States Tri-Service aircraft designation system the HSS-1N was redesignated the SH-34J Seabat.  At the end of 1962 the squadron transitioned to the SH-3A Sea King. The squadron performed eight Western Pacific (WESTPAC) deployments between 1957 and 1968 including combat tours in Vietnam. Notable achievements included a 1,200 mile medical evacuation (MEDEVAC) made by helicopter, the longest in history. Other squadron achievements included participation in the Apollo VI space vehicle/crew recovery and performing more than 30 Combat Search and Rescue missions in North Vietnam. The squadron was disestablished in December 1968. 

A year later on 1 November 1969, a new squadron was established and designated HS-8. Although the two squadrons are separate squadrons and the lineage of the first does not transfer to the second, the newly established squadron adopted the former squadron's name, insignia and traditions in its honor.  With the new squadron came new helicopters, namely the SH-3D Sea King. Notable achievements during the next decade included site surveys for the U.S. Atomic Energy Commission, a study of blue whale migration patterns, supporting President Richard Nixon during his working vacation aboard  and deploying in response to the Iranian hostage crisis. In 1975 the squadron transitioned to the SH-3H Sea King. In 1976 the American Bicentennial Committee honored HS-8 as a bicentennial command. The squadron's 19th deployment came in response to Desert Shield/Desert Storm in December 1990. This deployment was the last for HS-8 in the SH-3.

On 2 April 1993 HS-8 completed transition from the SH-3H into the new SH-60F and HH-60H Seahawk helicopters. The squadron's 20th WESTPAC deployment was from February to August 1994. HS-8 was a member of Carrier Air Wing 14 (CVW-14) aboard . Deployments after this were routine until 11 September 2001.

From November 2001 to May 2002 HS-8 and Carrier Air Wing Nine deployed in Operation Enduring Freedom. There they played a vital role in the campaign that ended with the removal of the Taliban government in Afghanistan. 

HS-8 made another WESTPAC deployment from January to September 2003 followed by their second "Around the World Cruise" from January to August 2005 aboard USS Carl Vinson. The squadron earned the Carrier Air Wing Nine Golden Wrench Award for superior maintenance and mission completion percentages as well as the Battle E Device (Navy Battle Efficiency Award) for the 2005 World Cruise. In early December 2005 an HS-8 helicopter and aircrew participated in filming a portion of the television show 24 where the helicopter was transporting the fictitious Russian president and his wife to the American presidents ranch.

On 28 September 2007, at Naval Air Station North Island, Helicopter Antisubmarine Squadron Eight was redesignated as Helicopter Sea Combat Squadron Eight and received its first MH-60S Seahawk with the armed helo kit. In January 2009, HSC-8 went on its first deployment with the MH-60S where it was joined by HSM-71 flying the MH-60R Seahawk aboard . During this deployment, HSC-8 assisted in the filming of Transformers: Revenge of the Fallen.

Starting the first of two back-to-back eight-month deployment cycles, HSC-8 embarked on a WESTPAC deployment in July 2011. HSC-8 also assisted in counter piracy operations, successfully aiding in the capture of fifteen suspected pirates.

After a short turn around, HSC-8 departed on an eight-month surge deployment to the 5th Fleet Area of Responsibility in September 2012.  HSC-8 deployed as part of Carrier Air Wing NINE (CVW-9) aboard USS John C. Stennis in support of Operation Enduring Freedom, maritime security operations, and theater security exercises.  One of the highlights of the deployment was the rescue of a drowning man in the Straits of Malacca- the Eightballer’s first overwater rescue in several years. HSC-8 also participated in Operation Beacon Flash, a joint security exercise with the Royal Omani Air Force.

Squadron aircraft

First squadron designated HS-8 (1 June 1956 to 31 Dec 1968)
   HSS-1N Seabat, (redesignated SH-34J in 1962): 1956–1962
   SH-3A Sea King, 1962–1968 (squadron disestablished)

Second squadron designated HS-8/HSC-8 (1 Nov 1969 to present)
   SH-3D Sea King, 1969–1975
   SH-3H Sea King, 1975–1992
   SH-60F Seahawk, 1992–2007 
   SH-60H Seahawk, 1992–2007 
   MH-60S Seahawk, 2007–present (redesignated HSC-8 in 2007)

Squadron awards
National Bicentennial Command
1976
Navy Unit Commendation
1990
Meritorious Unit Commendation
1985
1987 
1996 
2003
Battle E Device (Navy Battle Efficiency Award)
1980
1983 
1986 
1995 
2005
2009
2012
2017
Captain Arnold Jay Isbell Trophy for Antisubmarine Warfare Excellence
Eight Awards
2006
Admiral Jimmy Thach Award for Best Carrier Antisubmarine Warfare Squadron in the Navy
Five Awards
2006
Top Torpedo Award for Antisubmarine Warfare Excellence
1982 
1983 
1984 
1991 
1992
Sikorsky Superior Maintenance Award
1983 
1984 
1985 
2003
2012
Navy Golden Anchor Award
1991 
1997
2016
2017
Chief of Naval Operations Safety Award
1983 
1985 
1986 
1990 
1994
2002 "for 22 years and 72,000 flight hours without a Class 'A' mishap."
2012
Naval Air Forces Medical Readiness Award
2012
2016
2017

Ships deployed aboard
 1958–1968
 1958–1968
 1960–1974

 1970

 1983–1984   
 1984–1990
 1990–1993
 1995–2000, 2013-2017
 1993–1994, 2003–2005
 2000–2003, 2006–2015
 2011–2012
 2012–2013
 2019-current

See also 
 History of the United States Navy
 Helicopter Squadrons
 CVW-11

References 

 HSC-8 Established, navy.mil
 , http://www.public.navy.mil/airfor/hsc8

External links 
 , http://www.public.navy.mil/airfor/hsc8

Helicopter sea combat squadrons of the United States Navy
Military units and formations in California